The Hague Netherlands Temple is the 114th operating temple of the Church of Jesus Christ of Latter-day Saints (LDS Church).

History
The building of an LDS temple in Zoetermeer, a satellite city of The Hague, was announced on August 16, 1999. This temple serves more than 13,000 members from the Netherlands, Belgium, and parts of France.

Orson Hyde, a member of the Quorum of the Twelve Apostles, first entered the Netherlands in 1841 to serve a church mission. On his way to Jerusalem, he stayed for a little more than a week preaching the gospel. It was not until twenty years later in 1861 that the first LDS missionaries were officially sent to the Netherlands. On October 1, 1861, near the village Broek bij Akkerwoude (now part of the Dantumadeel municipality) the first converts to the LDS Church in the Netherlands were baptized. People from the Netherlands joined the LDS Church by the thousands, but most emigrated to the United States to be in Utah near church headquarters.  In more recent years church leadership has asked members to stay in their own lands and build up the church. The LDS Church has continued to steadily grow in the Netherlands and there are now three stakes and 7,800 members.

A groundbreaking ceremony and site dedication for The Hague Netherlands Temple was held on August 26, 2000. The site chosen for the temple is in a city park. Temple construction quickly began. Because the site bought by the church is only slightly larger than the area needed for the temple, a parking garage and temple clothing store were built underneath the temple.
 
An open house for the public was held August 17–31, 2002. LDS Church president Gordon B. Hinckley dedicated The Hague Netherlands Temple on September 8, 2002.

In 2020, The Hague Netherlands Temple was closed in response to the coronavirus pandemic.

See also

 Comparison of temples of The Church of Jesus Christ of Latter-day Saints
 List of temples of The Church of Jesus Christ of Latter-day Saints
 List of temples of The Church of Jesus Christ of Latter-day Saints by geographic region
 Temple architecture (Latter-day Saints)
 The Church of Jesus Christ of Latter-day Saints in the Netherlands

References

External links
 
 Official The Hague Netherlands Temple page
 The Hague Netherlands Temple at ChurchofJesusChristTemples.org

2002 establishments in the Netherlands
21st-century Latter Day Saint temples
Buildings and structures in The Hague
Religious buildings and structures in the Netherlands
Temples (LDS Church) completed in 2002
Temples (LDS Church) in Europe
The Church of Jesus Christ of Latter-day Saints in the Netherlands
The Hague Netherlands Temple
21st-century religious buildings and structures in the Netherlands